Adoree' K. Jackson (born September 18, 1995) is an American football cornerback and return specialist for the New York Giants of the National Football League (NFL). He played college football at USC and was drafted by the Tennessee Titans in the first round of the 2017 NFL Draft.

Early years
Jackson was born on September 18, 1995, in Belleville, Illinois. During his freshman year in high school, he attended Belleville East High School. He moved to California prior to his sophomore year in high school. Jackson attended Junípero Serra High School in Gardena, California. He played numerous positions including wide receiver, running back, defensive back, and return specialist. Jackson was rated by Rivals.com as a five-star recruit and was ranked as the number one athlete and sixth best player overall in his class. He committed to the University of Southern California (USC) to play college football. Jackson also played basketball and ran track and field in high school.

College career
 Jackson majored in communications with a real estate minor at USC. Jackson played in 12 games as a true freshman in 2014. He played cornerback, wide receiver, and return specialist. He was the Pac-12 Freshman of the Year. In the 2014 Holiday Bowl, he had a 98-yard kickoff return touchdown and a 71-yard touchdown reception in USC's 45–42 win. He finished his freshman season with 50 tackles, three receiving touchdowns, and two return touchdowns.

Jackson was named a Freshman All-American by Football Writers Association of America and Pac-12 Defensive Freshman of the Year by the Pac-12 coaches.

In the 2015 season, Jackson finished with 27 receptions for 414 receiving yards and two receiving touchdowns. In addition, he recorded two punt return touchdowns and one interception return for a touchdown.

Jackson placed fifth in the long jump (almost 26 feet) and 4th in the 4×100 meters 2015 NCAA outdoor track and field championship earning two All-American awards. He also won the 2015 Pac-12 Conference Championship long jump.

On November 12, 2016, Jackson intercepted two passes from Washington's quarterback Jake Browning, helping the Trojans win their fifth straight game and upset the fourth-ranked Huskies, who were undefeated at the time.

On December 8, 2016, Jackson was awarded the 2016 Jim Thorpe Award as the nation's top defensive back.

On January 16, 2017, Jackson announced he would forgo his senior season and enter the 2017 NFL Draft.

College statistics
Defense

Offense / special teams

Professional career
On March 22, 2017, Jackson participated at USC's Pro Day. He ran positional drills and completed the three-cone drill, while also meeting with team representatives and scouts from all 32 NFL teams. Jackson was ranked the tenth best cornerback in the draft by Sports Illustrated, ranked the seventh best cornerback by ESPN, ranked the sixth best by NFLDraftScout.com, was ranked the fifth best cornerback by NFL analyst Mike Mayock, and was ranked the second best cornerback by NFL analyst Bucky Brooks.

The Tennessee Titans selected Jackson in the first round (18th overall) of the 2017 NFL Draft.

Tennessee Titans

2017 season

On May 23, 2017, the Titans signed Jackson to a fully guaranteed four-year, $11.28 million contract that also includes a signing bonus of $6.34 million. He competed with Logan Ryan, LeShaun Sims, Brice McCain, and Kalan Reed throughout training camp for the vacant starting cornerback positions after the departure of Jason McCourty and Perrish Cox during the off season. Head coach Mike Mularkey named him the starting cornerback, opposite Logan Ryan, and punt returner to begin the regular season.

Jackson made his NFL debut in the season-opener against the Oakland Raiders. He recorded four solo tackles, two pass deflections, and 40 return yards in a 16–26 loss. In the next game against the Jacksonville Jaguars, Jackson recorded three solo tackles and returned two punts for 55 yards in a 37-16 road victory. The following week, he collected five combined tackles, defended two passes, and returned five punts for a total of 51 yards in a 33–27 victory over the Seattle Seahawks. During Week 9, Jackson recorded eight combined tackles, deflected a pass, and had his first NFL carry for a 20-yard gain in a 23–20 win over the Baltimore Ravens. In the next game against the Cincinnati Bengals, he had two tackles and two pass deflections along with 30 rushing yards as the Titans won by a score of 24-20. The following week, Jackson had 11 tackles, two pass deflections, and a forced fumble along with five rushing yards in a 40-17 road loss to the Pittsburgh Steelers. In the regular-season finale against the Jaguars, he had five tackles, two pass deflections, and a forced fumble in a 15-10 victory.

Jackson finished his rookie season with 70 tackles, three forced fumbles, 17 pass deflections, 868 return yards, and 55 rushing yards.

The Titans finished second in the AFC South with a 9–7 record and made the playoffs as a Wild Card team. In the Wild Card Round against the Kansas City Chiefs, Jackson had four tackles and 61 return yards in the narrow 22-21 road victory. In the Divisional Round against the New England Patriots, he had three tackles and 83 return yards in the 35–14 road loss.

2018 season
During Week 2 against the Houston Texans, Jackson recorded his first NFL interception by picking off Deshaun Watson. He finished the 20-17 victory with 6 tackles, two pass deflections, and an interception. Three weeks later, he recorded his second interception by picking off Josh Allen in the narrow 13-12 road loss. The Titans finished the 2018 season with a 9-7 record and barely missed out on the playoffs.

Jackson finished his second season with 73 tackles, 10 pass deflections, and two interceptions.

2019 season
In the season-opener against the Cleveland Browns, Jackson recorded five tackles in a 43-13 win. He missed the final four games of the regular season with a foot injury, but returned and started all three playoff games before the Titans were eliminated in the AFC Championship.

2020 season
On May 1, 2020, the Titans exercised the fifth-year option on Jackson's contract. He was placed on injured reserve on September 14, 2020 with a knee injury. He was activated on November 11, 2020.

Jackson was released by the Titans on March 16, 2021.

New York Giants
On March 23, 2021, Jackson signed a three-year, $39 million contract with the New York Giants. In Week 11 of the 2022 season in a loss against the Detroit Lions, Jackson suffered an MCL sprain.

NFL career statistics

Regular season

Defense

Offense / special teams

Postseason

Defense

Offense / special teams

Personal life
Jackson is a Christian. Jackson's mom, Vianca Jackson, is a breast cancer survivor. She was honored as the 12th Titan prior to a 2017 home game against the Indianapolis Colts. Lamar Jackson is his first cousin once removed.

References

External links

New York Giants bio
USC Trojans bio

1995 births
Living people
Sportspeople from Belleville, Illinois
Players of American football from Illinois
American football cornerbacks
American football wide receivers
American football return specialists
USC Trojans football players
USC Trojans men's track and field athletes
Tennessee Titans players
All-American college football players
New York Giants players
Junípero Serra High School (Gardena, California) alumni